Pioreşti may refer to several villages in Romania:

 Pioreşti, a village in Goiești Commune, Dolj County
 Pioreşti, a village in Poienarii Burchii Commune, Prahova County